Long State Prison is a medium security incarceration facility in Ludowici, Georgia, United States. It houses about 232 adult male offenders.

References

Prisons in Georgia (U.S. state)
Buildings and structures in Long County, Georgia